Francisca Antonia Parra Hartard (born 6 October 1999) is a field hockey player from Chile, who plays as a forward.

Career

Under–21
Francisca Parra made her debut for the Chile U–21 team in June 2018, during a test series against Canada in Victoria, B.C.

Las Diablas
Following her first junior appearance, Parra was called up to the national team in the September 2018, competing in the 2018–19 FIH Series Open in Santiago.

Parra continued to represent Las Diablas in 2019, making her first appearance during a test series against Ireland in Santiago. In June, Parra represented Chile at the FIH Series Finals in Hiroshima, winning her first medal at a major tournament, taking home bronze. Later that year she represented the team at the Pan American Games in Lima, and the FIH Olympic Qualifiers in London, failing to qualify for the 2020 Summer Olympics on both occasions.

In 2020, Parra returned to the international fold with appearances in a January test series against Japan in Santiago.

International goals

References

External links
 
 

1999 births
Living people
Chilean female field hockey players
Female field hockey forwards
Sportspeople from Santiago
Competitors at the 2022 South American Games
South American Games gold medalists for Chile
South American Games medalists in field hockey
20th-century Chilean women
21st-century Chilean women